"(Not) The Love of My Life" is a song by Malaysian singer-songwriter Yuna, released as the fourth single from her fourth international album (her seventh overall), Rouge. The song was co-written by Yuna, Alexandra Govere and Robin Hannibal and released on August 22, 2019 by Verve Forecast Records.

Music video

The official video for "(Not) The Love of My Life" was premiered on Yuna's official YouTube and Vevo account on 22 August 2019. The video features Bollywood-theme with Yuna herself served as a director. In the video, Yuna wears Indian costumes and traditional folk jewelry from head to toe. The video also marks Yuna’s second collaboration with Indian traditional choreographer, Harshini Sukumaran after "Forevermore".

Critical reception
In a retrospective review of Rouge, Skylar de Paul from The Daily Californian said: "(Not) The Love of My Life" continues following Yuna’s emotional growth. Each lyric is enunciated like spoken word, showing she wants to make her message clear: The person she’s singing to is not really "the one"". Adriane Pontecorvo from PopMatters described the song "has gorgeous color to its melody, in no small part due to Yuna's dulcet scorn".

Release history

References

2019 singles
2019 songs
Yuna (singer) songs
Songs written by Yuna (singer)
Songs written by Robin Hannibal
Songs written by Shungudzo